Night Flight is a 2014 South Korean drama film written, directed and edited by Leesong Hee-il. It made its world premiere in the Panorama section of the 64th Berlin International Film Festival on February 7, 2014, and was released in theaters in South Korea on August 28, 2014.

Plot
Three teenage boys, Shin Yong-joo, Han Ki-woong and Ko Ki-taek, were best friends in middle school. While Yong-joo and Ki-taek still remain close, Ki-woong becomes a jjang (Korean slang term meaning "best"), one of the strongest fighters in the school, and begins to hang out with Sung-jin's gang (Sung-jin's parents are powerful figures, making him a bigwig among his schoolmates), meaning he draws away from the other two, particularly when Yong-joo becomes concerned when he finds out that Sung-jin's gang is mercilessly bullying Ki-taek, an eccentric manhwa fan.

Under intense pressure to get into a prestigious university because his mother is single and financially struggling, Yong-joo develops an unlikely relationship with Ki-woong, who tries to break away from Sung-jin. But when Ki-taek learns that Yong-joo is gay, he retaliates for a past slight and betrays his friend and joins Sung-jin's gang in ostracizing him, telling them that Yong-joo has loved Ki-woong for years.

Cast
Kwak Si-yang as Shin Yong-joo
Lee Jae-joon as Han Ki-woong
Choi Joon-ha as Ko Ki-taek
Kim Chang-hwan as Oh Sung-jin
Lee Ik-joon as Song Joon-woo
Park Mi-hyun as Yong-joo's mother
Kim So-hee as Ki-woong's mother
Lee Gun-hee as Jae-ho
Yoon Gun-il as Bum-jin
Lee Seo-won as Jong-pil
Song Ji-ho as Jae-yeon 
Park Jin-ah as Hyun-joo
Ok Joo-ri as Ki-taek's mother
Pyo Jin-ki as Jin-ki
Kim Sun-bin as Dean of students
Hyun Sung as Homeroom teacher 
Park Hyuk-kwon as Big guy 
Jung In-gi as Ki-woong's father 
Lee Yi-kyung as Student part-timer

Production
Leesong Hee-il is Korea's top queer cinema director, and this was his fourth feature. He said he found the motif of the film from a CCTV video clip, which showed a high school student crying in an elevator just before he killed himself. After seeing that, Leesong decided to make a film exploring teenage sexual minorities and the dehumanization they face in order to survive the bullying and violence they experience at school.

Film festivals
Besides the Berlinale, Night Flight also screened at the 38th Hong Kong International Film Festival, the 7th CinemAsia Film Festival in Amsterdam, the 29th Torino GLBT Film Festival, the 15th Jeonju International Film Festival, the 68th Edinburgh International Film Festival, the 47th Sitges Film Festival, the 34th Hawaii International Film Festival, and the 25th Stockholm International Film Festival.

Awards and nominations

References

External links
Night Flight at Naver 

South Korean coming-of-age films
2014 films
LGBT-related drama films
2014 LGBT-related films
South Korean LGBT-related films
South Korean drama films
South Korean teen films
2010s South Korean films